The chairman of the government of the Pridnestrovian Moldovan Republic also informally known as the prime minister of Transnistria is the de facto head of government of the unrecognized Pridnestrovian Moldovan Republic, that is de jure part of Moldova.

The current prime minister is Aleksandr Rosenberg, since 30 May 2022, under the presidency of Vadim Krasnoselsky.

History
From 3 September to 29 November 1990, there was a separate position of Chairman of the Government (Council of Ministers), the acting was Stanislav Moroz. After that, the office of Prime Minister was abolished. Until 2012, the head of government was the president.

The office of Prime Minister of Transnistria was introduced on 1 January 2012 in accordance with amendments made in June 2011 to the Constitution of Transnistria.

List of prime ministers of Transnistria

See also
Politics of Transnistria
President of Transnistria

References

Transnistria
Transnistria